In number theory, a diophantine -tuple is a set of  positive integers  such that  is a perfect square for any  A set of  positive rational numbers with the similar property that the product of any two is one less than a rational square is known as a rational diophantine -tuple.

Diophantine m-tuples 
The first diophantine quadruple was found by Fermat:  It was proved in 1969 by Baker and Davenport  that a fifth positive integer cannot be added to this set.
However, Euler was able to extend this set by adding the rational number

The question of existence of (integer) diophantine quintuples was one of the oldest outstanding unsolved problems in number theory. In 2004 Andrej Dujella showed that at most a finite number of diophantine quintuples exist. In 2016 it was shown that no such quintuples exist by He, Togbé and Ziegler.

As Euler proved, every Diophantine pair can be extended to a Diophantine quadruple. The same is true for every Diophantine triple. In both of these types of extension, as for Fermat's quadruple, it is possible to add a fifth rational number rather than an integer.

The rational case 
Diophantus himself found the rational diophantine quadruple    More recently, Philip Gibbs found sets of six positive rationals with the property. It is not known whether any larger rational diophantine m-tuples exist or even if there is an upper bound, but it is known that no infinite set of rationals with the property exists.

References

External links
 Andrej Dujella's pages on diophantine m-tuples

Diophantine equations